Ras-related protein Rap-1A is a protein that in humans is encoded by the RAP1A gene.

Function 

The product of this gene belongs to the family of Ras-related proteins. These proteins share approximately 50% amino acid identity with the classical RAS proteins and have numerous structural features in common. The most striking difference between RAP proteins and RAS proteins resides in their 61st amino acid: glutamine in RAS is replaced by threonine in RAP proteins. The product of this gene counteracts the mitogenic function of RAS because it can interact with RAS GAPs and RAF in a competitive manner. Two transcript variants encoding the same protein have been identified for this gene.

Interactions 

RAP1A has been shown to interact with:

 C-Raf, 
 MLLT4,
 PDE6D, 
 RALGDS, 
 RAPGEF2,  and
 TSC2.

References